The Escondido Sub is a  branch railway line between Oceanside, California and Escondido, California, in the North County region of San Diego County. It is primarily used today by the Sprinter light rail and local freight trains serving Escondido industries late at night, after the last Sprinter train of the day is taken out of service.

History 
The line was built in 1888, along with the Surf Line, which is the main line it connects to on its western end and serves as the only rail connection between San Diego and Los Angeles. The line formerly served Santa Fe trains, with passenger trains operating until 1946. The North County Transit District, which operates local public transit services, purchased the line from the Santa Fe Railroad in 1992, to operate passenger rail service, which started on December 28, 2007. Before passenger service could start, the tracks of the branch were re-laid with new stations and an elevated loop constructed to Cal State San Marcos station, in preparation for the Sprinter.

Local Santa Fe (later BNSF) freight trains continued to operate over the line until 2008, when the service was contracted out to Pacific Sun Railroad; this practice ended on October 1, 2020, when PSRR's contract with BNSF expired.  For a very short amount of time, NCTD used Coaster Equipment for track repairs. In 2020, the Pacific Sun railroad stopped service, and freight operations on the line were given back to the BNSF Railway, which also operates freight service on the connecting Surf Line.

References 

California railroads
BNSF Railway lines